Cultural learning is the way a group of people or animals within a society or culture tend to learn and pass on information. Learning styles are greatly influenced by how a culture socializes with its children and young people.  Cross-cultural research in the past fifty years has primarily focused on differences between Eastern and Western cultures.   Some scholars believe that cultural learning differences may be responses to the physical environment in the areas in which a culture was initially founded.   These environmental differences include climate, migration patterns, war, agricultural suitability, and endemic pathogens.  Cultural evolution, upon which cultural learning is built, is believed to be a product of only the past 10,000 years and to hold little connection to genetics.

Overview 
Cultural learning allows individuals to acquire skills that they would be unable to do independently over the course of their lifetimes.  Cultural learning is believed to be particularly important for humans. Humans are weaned at an early age compared to the emergence of adult dentition.  The immaturity of dentition and the digestive system, the time required for growth of the brain, and the rapid skeletal growth needed for the young to reach adult height and strength mean that children have special digestive needs and are dependent on adults for a long period of time.  This time of dependence also allows time for cultural learning to occur before passage into adulthood.

On the basis of cultural learning, people create, remember, and deal with ideas. They understand and apply specific systems of symbolic meaning. Cultures have been compared to sets of control mechanisms, plans, recipes, rules, or instructions. Cultural differences have been found in academic motivation, achievement, learning style, conformity, and compliance.  Cultural learning is dependent on innovation, or the ability to create new responses to the environment and the ability to communicate or imitate the behaviour of others.  Animals that are able to solve problems and imitate the behaviour of others are therefore able to transmit information across generations.

Cass Sunstein described in 2007 how Wikipedia moves us past the rigid limits of socialist planning that Friedrich Hayek attacked on the grounds that "no planner could possibly obtain the dispersed bits of information held by individual members of society. Hayek insisted that the knowledge of individuals, taken as a whole, is far greater than that of any commission or board, however diligent and expert."

Examples
An example of cultural transmission can be seen in post-World War II Japan during the American occupation of the country. There were political, economic, and social changes in Japan influenced by America. Some changes include changes to their constitution, reforms, and the consumption of media, which were influenced by American occupiers. The occupation of Japan by the Japanese turned into a strong link between nations. Over time, Japanese culture began to accept American touchstones like jazz and baseball, while Americans were introduced to Japanese cuisine and entertainment.

A modern approach to cultural transmission would be that of the internet. One example would be millennials, who "are both products of their culture as well as influencers." Millennials are often the ones teaching older generations how to navigate the web. The teacher has to accommodate to the learning process of the student, in this case an older generation student, in order to transmit the information fluently and in a manner that is easier to understand. This goes hand in hand with the Communication Accommodation Theory, which "elaborates the human tendency to adjust their behaviour while interacting." The end result would be that, with the help of someone else, people are able to share their newly acquired skills among people in their culture, which was not possible before.

Humans also tend to follow "communicative" ways of learning, as seen in a study by Hanna Marno, a researcher at the International School for Advanced Studies. In the study, infants followed an adult's action of pressing a button to light up a lamp based on the adult's "non-verbal (eye contact) and verbal cues."

In non-human animals

Enculturation can also be used to describe the raising of an animal in which the animal acquires traits and skills that would not otherwise be acquired if it were raised by another of its own species. 

Cultural learning is dependent on innovation, or the ability to create new responses to the environment and the ability to communicate or imitate the behavior of others.  Animals that are able to solve problems and imitate the behavior of others are therefore able to transmit information across generations. A wide variety of social animals learn from other members of their group or pack. Wolves, for example, learn multiple hunting strategies from the other pack members. A large number of bird species also engage in cultural learning; such learning is critical for the survival of some species. Dolphins also pass on knowledge about tool use.

See also
 Educational anthropology
 Intercultural competence
 Intercultural communication principles
 Socialization
 Dual inheritance theory

References

Inline

General
 van Shaik, Carel P. & Burkart, Judith M. (2011). "Social learning and evolution: the cultural intelligence hypothesis". Philosophical Transactions of the Royal Society B: Biological Sciences, 366(1567), 1008-1016
 Chang, Lei; Mak, Miranda C. K.; Li, Tong; Wu, Bao Pei; Chen, Bin Bin; & Lu, Hui Jing (2011). "Cultural Adaptations to Environmental Variability: An Evolutionary Account of East–West Differences" (PDF). Educational Psychology Review, 23(1), 99-129. doi:10.1007/s10648-010-9149-0
 Lehmann, L. L., Feldman, M. W., & Kaeuffer, R. R. (2010). "Cumulative cultural dynamics and the co-evolution of cultural innovation and transmission: an ESS model for panmictic and structured populations". Journal of Evolutionary Biology, 23(11), 2356-2369. doi:10.1111/j.1420-9101.2010.02096.x
 MacDonald, K. (2007). "Cross-cultural Comparison of Learning in Human Hunting". Human Nature, 18(4), 386-402. doi:10.1007/s12110-007-9019-8

"The American Occupation of Japan, 1945-1952 | Asia for Educators | Columbia University".

Applied learning
Human communication